Six teams qualified for the Olympic softball tournament, including Japan, which, as host nation, qualified automatically. The United States team won the 2018 Women's Softball World Championship to qualify for the Olympics. The remaining four spots were allocated through three qualification tournaments: one spot for a Europe/Africa tournament, one spot for an Asia/Oceania tournament, and two spots for an Americas tournament.

Table

2018 Women's Softball World Championship

The World Championships featured 16 teams, with the winner earning an Olympic qualification spot (awarded to the runner-up instead if Japan wins). The United States advanced to the final against already qualified host Japan, securing Olympic qualification.

Qualified teams

Group stage
 Group A

 Group B

Final round

Medal Round

Africa/Europe Qualifying Event
One quota spot was awarded at a combined continental qualifying tournament for Africa and Europe to be held from 23 to 27 July 2019. The tournament featured eight teams: the top six from the 2019 ESF Women's Championship and the top two from the 2019 Softball Africa Cup. Teams were split into two groups with winners and runners up advancing into Super Round. The draw was held in WBSC headquarters in Lausanne, Switzerland 10 July 2019.

 Qualified teams

Pre-Qualification

2019 ESF Women's Championship
The 2019 European championship was held from 30 June to 6 July 2019.

Participants

Final standings

2019 Softball Africa Cup
The 2019 Softball Africa Cup was held from 9 to 12 May 2019 in South Africa.

Participants

Final Standings

Final Africa-Europe Qualifier
Group A

Group B

Super Round

Final standings

Asia/Oceania Qualifying Event
One quota spot was awarded at a combined continental qualifying tournament for Asia and Oceania to be held from 24to 29 September 2019 in Shanghai, China. The tournament will feature eight teams: the top six from the Asian Softball Championship 2019 and the top two from the Oceania Softball Championship 2019. Teams were split into two groups with top two advancing into Super Round. Draw was held in WBSC headquarters in Lausanne, Switzerland 10 July 2019.

Qualified teams
Asian Softball Championship 2019

Oceania Softball Championship 2019

Final Oceania-Asia Qualifier
Group A

Group B

Super Round

Final standings

Americas Qualifying Event
Two quota spots were allocated to the winner and runner-up of the Americas Qualifying Event to be held from 25 August to 1 September 2019 in Surrey, British Columbia, Canada. Tournament consisted of 12 teams split into two groups. Top three teams advanced to Super Round. Winner and runner-up of Super Round qualified for the Olympics. Qualification for the event was determined by placing in the 2019 Pan American Championship. The draw was held 29 April in WBSC headquarters in Lausanne, Switzerland. Argentina and British Virgin Island withdrew from the competition.

Participants

Group stage
Group A

Group B

Placement round
Teams failing to reach the Super Round play in Placement matches. The game between the 6th placed teams was cancelled due to Argentina and British Virgin Island withdrawing from the competition.
9th place Game

7th place Game

Super Round

Final standings

See also
Baseball at the 2020 Summer Olympics – Qualification

References

Qualification for the 2020 Summer Olympics
Softball at the 2020 Summer Olympics